Khanjar Qeshlaqi (also Romanized as Khanjar Qeshlāqī; also known as Qeshlāq-e Khanjar) is a village in Torkaman Rural District, in the Central District of Urmia County, West Azerbaijan Province, Iran. At the 2006 census, its population was 184, in 48 families.

References 

Populated places in Urmia County